Chromatochlamys is a genus of fungi belonging to the family Thelenellaceae.

The genus was first described by Trevisan in 1860.

Species:
 Chromatochlamys muscorum

References

Lecanoromycetes
Lecanoromycetes genera